"The Pressure Part 1" is a 1991 song by American recording artist group Sounds of Blackness. Released as the second single from their album, The Evolution of Gospel. The track was written by Gary Hines, James Samuel Harris III (better known as Jimmy Jam) and Terry Lewis.  "The Pressure Part 1" was the group's second release to make the US R&B singles chart where it peaked at #16.  The single was also the first of two number ones on the US dance chart. "The Pressure" was selected as one of the "100 Top Dance Songs" by Slant Magazine. The single was also featured in the 1996 Walt Disney Pictures movie First Kid.

Charts

See also
 List of number-one dance singles of 1991 (U.S.)

References

1991 singles
Gospel songs
1991 songs
Songs written by Jimmy Jam and Terry Lewis